David John Doukas (born 4 November 1957, Washington, DC), is an American family physician and bioethicist. He holds the James A. Knight Chair of Humanities and Ethics in Medicine, and directs the Program in Medical Ethics and Human Values at Tulane University's School of Medicine. Prof. Doukas also is the Executive Director of the Master of Science in Bioethics and Medical Humanities at Tulane University. Professor Doukas was Founding President of the Academy for Professionalism in Health Care from 2012 to 2019.

Biography

Doukas holds degrees in Biology and Religious Studies (B.A.) from the University of Virginia and an M.D. from Georgetown University School of Medicine. After completing a Family Practice internship at UCLA and residency st the University of Kentucky, he completed a Post-Doctoral Fellowship in Bioethics (1986–87) at the Joseph and Rose Kennedy Institute of Ethics of Georgetown University . He previously has served on the faculties of Georgetown University (1987-1989), the University of Michigan (1989-1999), the University of Pennsylvania (1999-2004), and as the William Ray Moore Endowed Chair of Family Medicine and Medical Humanism, the Director of the Division of Medical Humanism and Ethics, a Professor in the Department of Family and Geriatric Medicine, and co-Director of the Interdisciplinary Master of Arts in Bioethics Program at the University of Louisville (2004-2017). He joined the faculty of the Tulane University's School of Medicine in December of 2017.

Professional work
His  scholarship focuses on the areas of professionalism, primary care bioethics, genetics, and end-of-life care decision-making.  He is the originator of the concept termed the family covenant (1991), a health care agreement between a health provider and entire family that sets out to address proactively issues revolving around individual and family claims to medical information. Doukas and others subsequently applied the family covenant to genetic and end-of-life ethical circumstances. He is the co-developer and author of the Values History (1988) with LB McCullough as a method for eliciting the values and advance directives of patients toward life-prolonging care, that has been widely cited as a valuable means to enhance the process of identifying relevant patient values important in end-of-life care decision-making. He co-authored the book, Planning for Uncertainty (Johns Hopkins University Press, 1993, 2nd edition 2007) with William Reichel, M.D., which examines the evaluation of patient values and their relevance to advance directive selection. According to WorldCat, the book's two editions are held in 1031 libraries.

References

External links
Program in Medical Ethics and Human Values Website at Tulane University School of Medicine
Personal Web Page at Tulane University
MS in Bioethics and Medical Humanities, Tulane University

1957 births
Living people
American primary care physicians
Bioethicists
University of Louisville faculty
Georgetown University School of Medicine alumni
University of Virginia alumni